APICO is a 2022 beekeeping simulation video game developed by TNgineers and published by Whitethorn Games. It was released on 20 May 2022 to coincide with World Bee Day.

Gameplay 

APICO is a 2D beekeeping simulation and resource management game. Set in an archipelago where bees are commonplace, the player is tasked with discovering all of the species of bee in the world through exploration and cross-breeding. The game takes inspiration from real-life genetics and biology, with Punnett squares taking a key role in gameplay. Conservation of bees also plays into the mechanics of the game, with the player being rewarded for rehabilitating new species back into the wild.

There is also a heavy focus on menu management along with a multiple menu system, allowing for multiple menus to be open at once. A lot of the gameplay is done through these various in-game menus that have their own crafting minigames - like a "Sawbench" menu where you manually "chop" logs by dragging the mouse left and right on the interface, or a "Uncapper" menu when you "scrape" the Propolis from a Hive frame by dragging the mouse down. The developers talked more about these menu mechanics and the ability to have multiple menus open at once in an article for Game Developer.

Development and release 
The game is being developed by British developers TNgineers, made up of two brothers, Ell (ellraiser) and Jamie (metakitkat). The game's soundtrack is composed by German composer, Mothense, who has done both an official soundtrack plus a set of "bee-sides" that were ideas scrapped during the creation of the OST.

A key focus of the game was to make a relaxing, comforting game, with no real fail states or ways to lose. The developers mentioned this casual gameplay was something important to them especially with "the world being, you know, sh*t at the moment". They have mentioned that a portion of all sales will be donated to national and international beekeeping charities, and after getting their first sales through from Steam started to post their charity donations publicly.

A demo was originally released on Steam in September 2020, with multiple updates being released to keep the demo up to date with the current state of the game. The developers hadn't originally planned to get a publisher, but made the decision in January 2021 to team up with indie game publisher Whitethorn Games for support, and due to their casual/friendly ethos matching the focus for the game. At the same time, they also decided to move the game engine (previously JavaScript) into GameMaker Studio to help with console porting. A large update for the demo was released on World Bee Day 2021, which was the first update for the demo since the game was moved to GameMaker Studio.

The game was released on Steam on 20 May 2022 to coincide with World Bee Day 2022 and later released on Nintendo Switch on 7 July 2022. The developers of the game have confirmed that the game will be coming out on PlayStation 4, PlayStation 5, Xbox One, and Xbox Series X/S, but there is no confirmed release date yet.

Content updates 
In the release announcement post it was mentioned that there would be "2-3 content updates" worked on post-release. These have been solidified into three named updates:
 I Can't Beelieve It's Not Butter(flies) - focusing on adding solitary bees & butterflies to the game
 What Lies Beeneath - aimed at filling in the oceans with content and adding "bee-fishing"
 Hive Of Industry - geared towards more light automation as well as a second more final ending "so we can all say goodbye together"

It was announced on 7th November that the first of the three updates, the "Butterfly Update" would release on all PC platforms on 12th November.

There have been no dates announced yet for the other two updates.

References 

2022 video games
Fiction about beekeeping
Indie video games
Nintendo Switch games
Simulation video games
Xbox Series X and Series S games
Windows games
Xbox One games
PlayStation 4 games
PlayStation 5 games
Video games developed in the United Kingdom
Multiplayer and single-player video games
Video games about insects